The 1992 USC Trojans football team represented the University of Southern California (USC) in the 1992 NCAA Division I-A football season. In their sixth and final year under head coach Larry Smith, the Trojans compiled a 6–5–1 record (5–3 against conference opponents), finished in a tie for third place in the Pacific-10 Conference (Pac-10), and outscored their opponents by a combined total of 264 to 249.

USC's hundredth football season was also Larry Smith's last.  Though they placed third in the Pac-10 and secured a bowl berth, they lost their last three games including their rivalry games against Notre Dame and UCLA.  Smith was replaced at the end of the season by John Robinson, who returned to USC for a rare second tenure as head coach.

Quarterback Rob Johnson led the team in passing, completing 163 of 285 passes for 2,118 yards with 12 touchdowns and 14 interceptions.  Estrus Crayton led the team in rushing with 183 carries for 700 yards and five touchdowns. Curtis Conway led the team in receiving with 49 catches for 764 yards and five touchdowns; Johnnie Morton also had 49 catches for 756 yards and six touchdowns.

Schedule

Roster

Game summaries

Oklahoma

Source: Gainesville Sun

References

USC
USC Trojans football seasons
USC Trojans football